Bakalia is a town in East Karbi Anglong district, Assam, India.

Geography
It is located at an elevation of 84 m above MSL.

Location
Bakalia is connected by National Highway 36 to Nagaon and Dimapur. Nearest airport is Dimapur Airport. Guwahati is 200 km from here. The district headquarters is located at Diphu, 55 km away. Couple of buses ply from [Guwahati] to Diphu every day. Bakalia is situated on the NH 36 in the midway between Doboka and Dimapur.

Educational institutions
 J.S. Academy Junior College
 Bisheswar Public English School
 Eragaon English High School
Bakalia English High School
All Saint English High School and Residential
Rukasen College
Bakaliaghat higher secondary school
Hills Academy
Daffodil English High School
Adarsha High School
Sunpura Anchalik High School
 Umola ghar(play school)
 Janata Hindi High School.
 Indradhanu kola niketon.

Service Center
 PRASAD AUTOMOBILE SERVICE CENTER

References

External links
 Satellite map of Baguliaghat
 About Baguliaghat

Cities and towns in Karbi Anglong district